Robert Troy (born 24 January 1982) is an Irish Fianna Fáil politician who has been a Teachta Dála (TD) for the Longford–Westmeath constituency since 2011. 

From July 2020 to August 2022 he served as Minister of State at the Department of Enterprise, Trade and Employment with special responsibility for Trade Promotion. He resigned following revelations about his failure to declare property interests.

Biography
Troy was born in Mullingar in 1982, but is a native of Ballynacargy, County Westmeath. He attended Emper National School and boarded at St Finian's College, Mullingar, and was on the committee of National Youth Council of Ireland. He subsequently completed a certificate in marketing at the Dublin Business School. 

Troy was elected to Westmeath County Council in 2004, and re-elected in 2009. He was elected as a TD for the Longford–Westmeath constituency at the 2011 general election, beating the two sitting Fianna Fáil TDs, Peter Kelly and former cabinet Minister and Leader of the Seanad Mary O'Rourke.

Troy was the Fianna Fáil Spokesperson on Arts and Heritage from April 2011 to July 2012, when he was appointed as Spokesperson on Children. Following the 2016 general election he was appointed Fianna Fáil Spokesperson on Transport, Tourism and Sport.

In July 2020, following the formation of the 32nd Government of Ireland, Troy was appointed Minister of State at the Department of Enterprise, Trade and Employment with special responsibility for Trade Promotion.

Failure to declare property interests 
In August 2022, online news platform the Ditch reported that Troy had failed to declare his full business interests in the Register of Members Interests in line with the standard obligations of a TD. It was discovered that he had sold a property to Westmeath County Council, of which he was previously a member, in 2018. Troy claimed that this failure was an error on his part. 

It was later discovered that Troy had failed to register the sale of a second property to Longford County Council in 2019, and failed to declare an interest in a third house in Mullingar in 2020. It subsequently emerged in an RTÉ interview on 23 August 2022 that in all, he had 11 properties, nine of which he was renting out; he admitted he had failed to properly declare a property business he was involved in; and he was in receipt of income under the state-funded Rental Accommodation Scheme (RAS) for two properties. Around this time Troy had also spoken about increasing funding for that scheme.

On 24 August, it was revealed that one of Troy's rental properties had no fire certificate.

Ministerial resignation
Later on 24 August, Troy resigned as a Minister of State, insisting he had made genuine errors with his statutory declaration while saying he would not apologise for being a landlord. In a lengthy statement, he accepted the issue had now become a distraction for the coalition and the work his party was doing in the housing portfolio. He also criticised media coverage of the controversy. He said "I personally will not apologise for being a landlord. I bought my first house at the age of 20 as I went straight into a job after school, so I was in a position to purchase my first property then. I am not a person of privilege and I have not been brought up with a silver spoon in my mouth, I have worked for all I have."

References

External links

Robert Troy's page on Fianna Fáil website

1982 births
Living people
Fianna Fáil TDs
Local councillors in County Westmeath
Members of the 31st Dáil
Members of the 32nd Dáil
Members of the 33rd Dáil
Politicians from County Westmeath
Alumni of Dublin Business School
Ministers of State of the 33rd Dáil